Omer Dean Ehlers (June 22, 1929 – February 19, 2017) was an American college basketball and baseball coach and athletic administrator. He was the first athletic director for James Madison University and served for 22 years.

Ehlers played basketball and baseball as a student at Central Methodist University. He spent time playing baseball in the Brooklyn Dodgers organization and in the U.S. Army before embarking on his coaching career, starting as head baseball coach and assistant basketball coach at Memphis State University (now the University of Memphis). Ehlers then moved to James Madison, as the school's first athletic director while the school made the transition from a women's college to a co-ed institution. He coached the school's basketball team for a year, before hiring Lou Campanelli, who led the Dukes to their first NCAA tournament appearance in 1981. Ehlers was instrumental in founding the Colonial Athletic Association in 1985 and was the namesake for the Ehlers Award, granted by the conference to the men's and women's basketball players who “embodies the highest standards of leadership, integrity and sportsmanship in conjunction with his academic athletic achievement.”

Ehlers retired in 1993. He died on February 19, 2017, at age 87.

References

External links
 

1929 births
2017 deaths
Asheville Tourists players
Baseball catchers
Baseball players from Illinois
Basketball coaches from Illinois
Basketball players from Illinois
Central Methodist Eagles baseball players
Central Methodist Eagles men's basketball players
College men's basketball head coaches in the United States
Elmira Pioneers players
Geneva Robins players
James Madison Dukes athletic directors
James Madison Dukes men's basketball coaches
Memphis Tigers baseball coaches
Memphis Tigers men's basketball coaches
People from Jackson County, Illinois
Ponca City Dodgers players
Pueblo Dodgers players